Richard Depoorter (29 April 1915 – 16 June 1948) was a Belgian racing cyclist. He won the 1943 and 1947 editions of the Liège–Bastogne–Liège. He crashed into a tunnel wall on a "descent of the Sustenpas near Bern" during the 1948 Tour of Switzerland and died onsite or shortly thereafter due to his injuries.

See also
 List of professional cyclists who died during a race

References

External links
 

1915 births
1948 deaths
Belgian male cyclists
Cyclists from West Flanders
Cyclists who died while racing
Sport deaths in Switzerland
People from Ichtegem